Nərimanabad may refer to:
 Nərimanabad, Lankaran, Azerbaijan
 Nərimanabad, Yevlakh, Azerbaijan